A commando is an elite light infantry or special forces soldier, trained for quick raid operations. Commando is also an alternate term for military special forces.

Commando or Commandos may also refer to:

Military

Units 
British Commandos, a special operations force created during World War II
Portuguese Army Commandos, special forces unit of the Portuguese Army
3 Commando Brigade, the main manoeuvre formation of the British Royal Marines
Commando Raiders, Laotian pathfinders and special forces during the Laotian Civil War
Boer Commando (from 1658), the basic unit of organisation of the militia of the Boer people of South Africa

Materiel 
Colt CAR-15 "Commando", a short-barrel assault rifle
Curtiss C-46 Commando, an American transport aircraft
Commando (aircraft), a very long range Consolidated Liberator II aircraft

Other 
Commando (pigeon), a World War II messenger pigeon who received the Dickin Medal

Entertainment

Film and TV
Commando (1962 film), the American International Pictures title of the film Marcia o Crepa
Commandos (film), a 1968 World War II action film
Commando (1985 film), a film starring Arnold Schwarzenegger
Commando (1988 film), a Bollywood film by Babbar Subhash
Commando: A One Man Army, a 2013 Bollywood action film
Commando 2: The Black Money Trail, a 2017 sequel to 2013 film
Commando 3 (film), a 2019 sequel to 2017 film
Commandos, a meerkat group featured in Meerkat Manor
"Commando", the nickname of Steve Willis, a trainer on the Australian TV program The Biggest Loser

Games
Commando, an alternative name for the game Fugitive
Commando (role-playing game), a 1979 role-playing game
Commandos (series), a 1998–2006 stealth-oriented real-time tactics computer game series
Commando (video game), a 1985 video game (unrelated to the film)

Music
Commandos (album), a 1986 album by Stage Dolls
Commando (Niska album), a 2017 album by Niska
"Commando", a song by Ramones from the album Leave Home
"Commando", a song by Satyricon from the 2008 album The Age of Nero

Literature
Commando (book), an autobiography of guitarist and songwriter Johnny Ramone
Commando (comics), a British war comic
Commando: A Boer Journal of the Boer War, a personal account of the Second Boer War by Deneys Reitz

Vehicles
Cadillac Gage Commando, an amphibious armored personnel carrier
Norton Commando, a British motorcycle
Commando Jeep, a light tactical vehicle
Dodge 100 "Commando", a truck made by Dodge in Britain
Jeepster Commando, a line of Jeep models
"Commando", a series of high-performance engines made by Plymouth
Commando, a former yacht converted into commercial service

Other
Casio G'zOne Commando, an Android smartphone
 Colombo Commandos, a Sri Lankan domestic cricket team
Commando (horse) (1898–1905), American Hall of Fame Thoroughbred racehorse
"Commando" connectors, a term for IEC 60309 power connectors
A GUI tool for running command lines in the Macintosh Programmer's Workshop and later in A/UX
Commando (company), an American underwear company
Comandău (Kommandó in Hungarian), a commune in Covasna County, Romania
"To go commando", a slang term for not wearing underwear

See also
Kommando, a generic German word meaning unit or command